David William Simpkins (born 29 May 1934) is a former English cricketer.  Simpkins was a left-handed batsman who played primarily as a wicketkeeper.  He was born at Derry Hill, Wiltshire.

Simpkins made his Minor Counties Championship debut for Wiltshire against Dorset in 1963.  From 1963 to 1975, he represented the county in 20 Minor Counties Championship matches, the last of which came against Dorset.

Simpkins also represented Wiltshire in 2 List-A matches.  His List-A debut for the county came against Essex in the 1969 Gillette Cup.  His second and final List-A match for Wiltshire came against Hampshire in the 1973 Gillette Cup.  In his 2 List-A matches, he scored 7 runs at a batting average of 3.50, with a high score of 5.  Behind the stumps he took a single catch and made a single stumping.

Family
His son, also called David also represented Wiltshire in List-A and Minor Counties cricket, as well as playing a single first-class match for Gloucestershire.

References

External links
David Simpkins at Cricinfo
David Simpkins at CricketArchive

1934 births
Living people
People from Wiltshire
English cricketers
Wiltshire cricketers
Wicket-keepers